The Lakh Mazar inscription is a pre-historic stone wall estimated to be more than 7,000 years old and located near the Kooch village, about 29 km away from Birjand, Iran. It is the most valuable memorial plaque in eastern Iran due to its diversity and historical importance. The inscriptions were discovered by the Birjand Historical Research group and, after preliminary studies, 307 images, including a collection of inscriptions and motifs on the rocky mountains of Bagheran, were identified. Each inscription has a unique style from the period of its creation and can be analyzed independently of the others. As a general category, the Lakh Mazar inscriptions can be attributed to four major historical periods: the stone, pre-historic, historical, and Islamic periods. The inscriptions depict human, animal, and plant signs and symbols. From the 307 paintings and engravings on the rocks, 22 depict humanity, 33 depict animals, and 35 depict plant life. There are four pictorial lines, 81 inscriptions dated to the Pahlavi, Parthian, or Sassanid empires, 42 with Perso-Arabic script, and 67 rock paintings which have yet to be identified.

Swastikas 

The Lakh Mazar inscriptions contain swastikas or spinning wheels inscribed on stone walls. One instance is in Khorashad, Birjand, on the Lax e Mazar. Due to vandalism, some have been destroyed.

See also

 Iran
 Tall-i Bakun
 Persia
Rahmatabad Mound
Cities of the ancient Near East
Khorashad
Mahmuei
Mud
 Swastika curve
 zibad

Notes

External links 

 Iranika

 survey of lakh mazar
 survey of lakh Mazar  
swastika in Iran 

Prehistoric inscriptions
Archaeological artifacts
Khorasan
Treasure troves of Asia
Old Persian language
Middle Eastern objects in the British Museum
Archaeology of the Achaemenid Empire
Sculpture of the Ancient Near East
Jewellery
Persian art
19th-century archaeological discoveries
Art Nouveau collections
Geography of Iran
History of Iran
Central Asia